Claysville is an unincorporated community in Mineral County, West Virginia, United States, located at the intersection of West Virginia Route 93 and U.S. Route 50. It is part of the Cumberland, MD-WV Metropolitan Statistical Area.

The community bears the name of a pioneer settler.

Historic sites

Claysville Church

Log House of Claysville

References 

Unincorporated communities in Mineral County, West Virginia
Unincorporated communities in West Virginia
Northwestern Turnpike